Kratts' Creatures is a half-hour children's television series that originally ran on PBS Kids during the summer of 1996. The first in a series of programs produced by the Kratt Brothers, Chris and Martin Kratt, Kratts' Creatures was made to be the first wildlife show aimed specifically towards young children. It featured the Kratt Brothers as they traveled worldwide, exploring different animals and their habitats. They received assistance from their friends Allison Baldwin (Shannon Duff) and Ttark, an animated anthropomorphic dinosaur (voiced by Ron Rubin). The show ran for one season on PTV from June 3, 1996, to August 9, 1996, with 50 episodes, with reruns continuing to air until June 9, 2000 (August 31, 2001 (The day that Mister Rogers' Neighborhood aired its final episode), on select PBS member stations). Due to its popularity, the show inspired an unofficial spin-off, Zoboomafoo, created by the Kratts, which premiered on January 25, 1999.

Cast
 The Kratt Brothers:
Chris Kratt: The younger brother. Chris usually wears green in N. America and Africa, while he usually wears red in Central America and Australia.
Martin Kratt: The older brother. Martin usually wears blue in N. America, Africa, and Australia, while in Central America, he usually wears white.
Shannon Duff as Allison Baldwin: Allison is a personal agent of the Kratt Brothers. She is most commonly seen at their base of Creature Central but occasionally joins the brothers in the field. Allison is very adept with the gadgets at Creature Central and frequently expands on topics with research from the Creature-Web or books.
Ron Rubin as Ttark: Ttark is an anthropomorphic dinosaur who appears on television at Creature Central. Ttark frequently uses alliteration in creature-related turns of phrase. He is seen to be very knowledgeable about ancient and extinct animals but is often behind the times about the creatures of modern times. His name is "Kratt" spelt in reverse.

Featured Segments
A Chris and Martin Kratt Scientific Study
A Kratt Brothers Scientific Experiment
Allison's Animals
Salad or Creature
Stupid Things Not To Do With Animals

Episode list

VHS releases
In Search of the Tasmanian Tiger / Mungu's Revenge
Ultimate Animals / Big Five, Little Five
The Great Defenders / Spots and Stripes
Kickboxing Kangaroos / Koalas or Wombats
Wild Ponies / Phantom Wolves
Leopard: Prince of Stealth / Creatures of the Night
When? / The How Show
Hyenas are Cool / Three Cool Cats
Hanging with the Monkeys / Lion, King of Beasts
Heavyweights of Africa / Wings
Heavyweights of Africa / Around Africa in Eight Hours
Gator Glades / Sharks
Rainforests: Under the Canopy / Parched and Thirsty in the Outback
Behind the Scenes

External links
 

PBS original programming
1990s American children's television series
1996 American television series debuts
1996 American television series endings
1990s Canadian children's television series
1996 Canadian television series debuts
1996 Canadian television series endings
American children's education television series
American children's fantasy television series
American television series with live action and animation
Canadian children's education television series
Canadian children's fantasy television series
Canadian television series with live action and animation
English-language television shows
Nature educational television series
PBS Kids shows
Television series about brothers
Television series created by Chris Kratt
Television series created by Martin Kratt